"The Bends" is a song by the English rock band Radiohead from their second studio album, The Bends (1995). In Ireland, it was released by Parlophone on 26 July 1996 as the album's sixth and final single, and reached number 26 on the Irish Singles Chart.

"The Bends" was written in 1992, predating Radiohead's 1992 debut single, "Creep", and debut studio album, Pablo Honey (1993). Radiohead performed it numerous times over the next two years, before recording it at the Manor Studio in Oxfordshire, England, with producer John Leckie. It is one of Radiohead's most performed songs.

"The Bends" has been compared to the work of bands such as Queen, the Beatles, Pixies, the Smiths, and Oasis; the Radiohead singer, Thom Yorke, described it as a "Bowie pastiche". It contains five sections, making it one of the most complex tracks on The Bends. Several critics interpreted the lyrics as a comment on the success of "Creep", which had led the media to dub them a one-hit-wonder. Yorke said the lyrics were intended to be humorous and had been misinterpreted.

"The Bends" was included on the greatest hits album, Radiohead: The Best Of (2008), and other versions have appeared on compilations by Radiohead and other artists. In 2017, Uncut ranked it as the third-greatest Radiohead song. NME ranked the guitar solo as the seventh-greatest in music history.

Writing
"The Bends" is one of the earliest songs written by Radiohead, originally going under the title "The Benz". It was written primarily by singer Thom Yorke, while credited to all of the band members, prior to recording their debut album, Pablo Honey (1993). Yorke said in a 1995 interview: "['The Bends'] is one of those songs I was rambling around and just poured all this rubbish out into the song. Then it all started happening, which was a bit odd. I was completely taking the piss when I wrote it. Then the joke started wearing a bit thin." Radiohead also performed "The Bends" live numerous times prior to release. Bassist Colin Greenwood described the song as a "perennial hardy annual of a live favourite, faithfully committed live to tape."

In 1992, Radiohead recorded a 4-track demo for "The Bends" during the Pablo Honey sessions. Yorke introduced the demo to co-producer Paul Q. Kolderie at the end of the sessions, but kept it for their next album. In March 1993, Radiohead recorded another demo with their live sound engineer, Jim Warren, at Courtyard Studios in Oxfordshire, during the same session that produced "High and Dry". After the Pablo Honey tour ended, they sent the demo to producer John Leckie in order to work on their then-upcoming second album, The Bends.

Recording
"The Bends" was one of the songs selected as a potential follow-up single to "Creep" during the album recording. It was initially recorded at RAK Studios in London in sessions that took place from February to May 1994, and then re-recorded at the Manor Studio in Oxfordshire, where the band spent two weeks working on The Bends in July. According to drummer Philip Selway, the song was recorded in a single take: "I wanted to get away from the studio to view a house for rent. Consequently, this was the first take." However, Q reported that the song was recorded in several takes. The unreleased RAK version was mixed by Leckie at Abbey Road Studios in London.

Leckie felt the guitars were too loud and that the song was "overblown", but the band members felt otherwise. According to Leckie, the original version of "The Bends" was "more overpowering" than it is on the album, and Yorke's vocals were more screamed. Trying to make the introduction less "bombastic", Radiohead added "tinkling" sound effects Yorke had recorded on a cassette recorder through a hotel room window while touring in the United States. He said: "There was this guy training these eight-year-old kids, who were parading up and down with all these different instruments. The guy had this little microphone on his sweater and was going: 'Yeah, keep it up, keep it up.' So I ran out and taped it." "The Bends" was mixed by Sean Slade and Kolderie, who produced Pablo Honey and mixed most of The Bends, with additional mixing by Leckie.

Composition

Music
"The Bends" has been described as an alternative rock, hard rock, Britpop, grunge, and post-grunge song, with elements of arena rock, neo-psychedelia, and experimental rock. It contains classic rock guitar riffs, distortion effects and "soaring" vocals, and draws on Queen influences. The Gazette's Bill Reed likened the song to the late music of the Beatles, while Arizona Daily Sun's Christopher Burns referred to the Beatles' 1967 song "I Am the Walrus" in style and lyrics when focusing on "The Bends" opening line: "Where do we go from here?" PopMatters' Colin Fitzgerald compared the song's "huge major" chords and "melodic vocal hook" to Oasis' songs "Rock 'n' Roll Star" (1994) and "Some Might Say" (1995).

"The Bends" contains five sections, making it one of the most structurally complex songs on The Bends, and this structure has a sound arrangement that compared to the work of the Pixies. The song is played in the key of E minor in a  time signature with a tempo of 90 beats per minute (BPM), while Yorke's vocals span a range of A3 to G5. The chord progression follows a sequence of D–Cadd9–G/B–Cadd9–G/B–Cadd9, with a C chord following this sequence during the pre-verse.

"The Bends" begins with sampled sounds before moving to a chord sequence played in unison by the three guitarists: Yorke; Jonny Greenwood; and Ed O'Brien. During the second verse, Jonny briefly plays a counter-melody likened to the Smiths' 1984 song "How Soon Is Now?", and also plays a minor third. O'Brien described Jonny's guitar playing as "abusive". "The Bends" features a multi-tracked recorder played by Jonny, appearing low in the mix. The track also features trembling effects.

Lyrics

"The Bends" lyrics relate to topics including insecurity, loss of identity, social rejection, morbidity, indolence, faithlessness and stasis. Yorke said "The Bends" is addressed to all kinds of figures, particularly certain journalists who still cling to the Sixties trip, referring to the Britpop movement in the mid-1990s, which he described as "backwards-looking", while Jonny described the movement as "a 1960s revival." According to writer Jonathan Hale, the song was initially introduced as being about "knowing who your real friends are and when they're going to come to your gigs"; Yorke later simplified this to "knowing who your friends are."

Yorke said "The Bends" was a "Bowie pastiche". He said it was intended to be humorous, with lyrics such as "I want to be part of the human race" and the recurring lines "I wish it was the Sixties / I wish I could be happy". Yorke was irritated that the humour was overlooked; he was repeatedly asked in interviews if he really wished it was the 1960s. Scott Wilson of Fact interpreted the line as a "sarcastic dig" at other bands' "obsession with another era", such as the lyrics of Oasis' 1994 songs "Live Forever" and "Rock 'n' Roll Star". "The Bends" also contains lines about the CIA and the Marines, and has a repeated line: "Where are you now when I need you?"

The title "The Bends" references a term used in scuba diving to describe decompression sickness after divers return to the surface quickly. Though Radiohead wrote "The Bends" in 1992, before "Creep" was released in September of that year, commentators interpreted the title as a comment on the success of "Creep". Though "Creep" brought Radiohead early success, it caused some critics to label them as one-hit wonders. The lyrical themes of "The Bends" were compared to those of songs such as "So You Want to Be a Rock 'n' Roll Star" (1967) by the Byrds, "Pump It Up" (1978) by Elvis Costello and "Serve the Servants" (1993) by Nirvana.

Release and packaging
"The Bends" first appeared as a B-side live version, titled "The Benz", on the 1993 French release of "Creep", recorded for the French radio show Black Sessions on 23 February. It lasts three minutes and 58 seconds. The studio version was released as the second track on Radiohead's second album The Bends, released on 8 March 1995. It was included as the second track on the 1995 French reissue of "Creep" and the 1995 US 7-inch vinyl jukebox release of "Fake Plastic Trees".

More than a year after the release of The Bends, the title track was released as a single by Parlophone in Ireland on 26 July 1996, the same month when Radiohead began recording their then-upcoming third album, OK Computer (1997). The single was limited to only 2,000 copies and included live versions of "My Iron Lung" and "Bones", both recorded at the London Forum on 24 March 1995. The single was later made available for purchase on Amazon. The accompanying artwork features a graphic of an inhaler created by Stanley Donwood and Yorke; the latter is credited under the pseudonym "The White Chocolate Farm". The graphic also appeared on occasion in other works by Donwood. Written on the back of the CD single:

"The Bends" was previously released as a CD promotional single in the US by Capitol in 1995 with the same live tracks, while issued in Belgium by EMI Belgium in May 1996, included "Bones" as the second track. The artwork of the Belgian promo is the same as the artwork of The Bends. "The Bends" was included on the greatest hits album, Radiohead: The Best Of (2008).

The original 4-track demo of "The Bends" was included on the compilation Long Live Tibet (1997), a charity album organised by Tibet House Trust for Tibetan people, and featuring artists including David Bowie and Björk, and bands such as Pulp, Blur and Kula Shaker alongside Radiohead. It is also featured on the compilation MiniDiscs [Hacked] (2019). The demo lasts four minutes and 50 seconds and features loud guitars in the opening, played at a slower tempo than the final studio version, as well as "lifeless" vocals, "slightly" different lyrics and lo-fi production. Also unlike the studio version, Jonny's recorder sound is clearer in the demo.

Critical reception
Reviewing The Bends in 1995, Patrick Brennan of the Hot Press described the title track as "roaring, soaring and tormented". Jeremy Helligar of People wrote that it and "Planet Telex" "toss and turn like the best of those big restless Pearl Jam and U2 arena-size anthems." Clare Kleinedler of the Santa Cruz Sentinel wrote that the song "reflects the band's reputation for being the gods of freaks and weirdos around the world with York [sic] howling, 'We don't have any real friends'"; Kleinedler appreciated the "seemingly self-pitying line", seeing it as not really self-pity but instead "what defines Radiohead." Kevin McKeough of the Chicago Tribune said that "The Bends" and "Black Star" "could have been catchy little rockers" if Radiohead had dispensed with their "grandiose dramatic effects". The Boston Globe's Jim Sullivan wrote that the song is "full of stops, starts and slides, and Yorke established his voice as one in the English glam tradition of Ian Hunter and David Bowie, keeping company today with Oasis and Suede." Spence D. of CMJ New Music Monthly described "The Bends" as "a brilliant piece of raging guitar-driven pop".

Legacy
The Guardian critic Adam Sweeting called "The Bends" "a powerchord masterclass". In 2007, Anthony Strain of Treble wrote that it is "the only song [on The Bends] that sounds remotely dated; its last moments are the last the record spends squarely in the present." "The Bends" was included in the 2007 book The Rough Guide Book of Playlists and Xfm's 2010 book Top 1000 Songs of All Time. In 2012, Mark Lepage of The Gazette likened the song to "seeing the sunrise from a new angle." On the 20th anniversary of The Bends in 2015, Kenneth Partridge of Billboard wrote about the title track: "For the first 45 seconds, this could be an Oasis track. Then the vocals come in, and Yorke's piss-take on jaded rock-star behavior reveals a searing intelligence and contempt for the world that Noel Gallagher never gets at with his songwriting." Dean Essner of Consequence wrote: "On 'The Bends', Yorke tells us what it's like to swim with the sharks and then shortly after bake on a crowded beach with the rest of civilization, who are just waiting for something to happen, too."

In 2016, Fact named "The Bends" the 26th-greatest Radiohead song. In 2017, Pitchfork wrote that it "mopes in the mid-'90s zeitgeist's shadow, mooring Britpop's social theatricality in grunge's grandiose alienation." Radio Hauraki named "The Bends" the 19th best song of the 1990s. Consequence ranked the track as the 50th best Radiohead song, while Uncut ranked the track as the third greatest, behind "Creep" and "Planet Telex". NME ranked Jonny's guitar solo as the seventh greatest, describing it as a "steaming juggernaut of 90s grungey guitar goodness." In 2019, Vulture listed the song as the band's 76th best, writing: "This wiry, hard-charging song, in hindsight a clear iteration between Pablo Honey and OK Computer, was a solid answer, complete with military-industrial-complex imagery that still seems more playfully absurd than the deadly serious."

Live performances
"The Bends" is one of Radiohead's most performed songs and was described as a fan favourite by New York. It was the first song Radiohead performed from The Bends. The song was first performed at King Tut's Wah Wah Hut in Glasgow, Scotland in May 1992, four months before the band began recording Pablo Honey. They performed it on their early tours, including a performance at Roxane in Tel Aviv, Israel in April 1993, Cabaret Metro in Chicago, Illinois in June, and the Garage in Highbury, London in September. "The Bends" was included on the setlists of Radiohead's US tour with Belly.

In May 1994, Radiohead performed "The Bends" at the London Astoria; this performance was included on Live at the Astoria (1995) and the 2009 reissue of The Bends "Special Collectors Edition" on DVD. On 26 June, the band performed it for their set at the 1994 Glastonbury Festival. In March 1995, they performed "The Bends" at the London Forum. On 27 May, Radiohead performed it on the TV show Later... with Jools Holland; this performance was included on the compilation ...Later Volume One: Brit Beat, released in September 1996. The version lasts three minutes and 53 seconds. The album also features Britpop bands such as Oasis, Suede, Supergrass and Elastica. The performance was included on the 2009 DVD "Special Collectors Edition" reissue. In 2017, The Telegraph named the performance the sixth-greatest in the history of the show. Radiohead also performed "The Bends" on MTV's program 120 Minutes in March 1996.

"The Bends" was included on the setlists of the OK Computer tour, including the televised performance at the 1997 Glastonbury Festival in June, the 1997 festival Les Eurockéennes de Belfort in France in July, and the London Astoria performance in September. Radiohead performed "The Bends" on their tours for Kid A (2000), Amnesiac (2001), Hail to the Thief (2003), and In Rainbows (2007). In January 2010, they performed a rendition of it at the Fonda Theatre in Los Angeles; this performance was included on Radiohead for Haiti (2010). After six years without performing "The Bends", Radiohead performed it at some shows on the tour for their ninth album, A Moon Shaped Pool (2016).

Covers and other usage

The American heavy metal band, Anthrax, released a B-side cover of "The Bends" on their 1998 single "Inside Out". The band's drummer, Charlie Benante, wrote on the single's notes: "We chose to do this song cause Radiohead are like the Pink Floyd of this era." It was included as a bonus track on the 2003 reissue of their eighth album, Volume 8: The Threat Is Real, originally released in 1998. In 2013, Ryan Smith of Whatzup described the version as "a passable but unremarkable cover and was quickly forgotten."

The American jam band, Joe Russo's Almost Dead, performed a cover of the song at the Ritz in Raleigh, North Carolina on 31 October 2015. They performed it on other occasions in 2017 and 2018. In December 2020, the Irish singer, Rosie Carney, covered the song on her full cover album of The Bends. The English trip hop band, Massive Attack, sampled "The Bends" on their 2006 track "False Flags".

Track listings

Personnel
Credits adapted from the CD single liner notes, except where noted:

Radiohead 
 Thom Yorke vocals, rhythm guitar, tape effects
 Jonny Greenwood lead and rhythm guitars, organ, recorder, piano
 Ed O'Brien rhythm guitar
 Colin Greenwood bass guitar
 Philip Selway drums

Technical
 John Leckie production; engineering, additional mixing
 Nigel Godrich engineering
 Chris Brown engineering
 Sean Slade mixing
 Paul Q. Kolderie mixing

Artwork
 Stanley Donwood fine art
 Thom Yorke  fine art
 Binge design
 The Whole Hog pasting

Charts

See also
 Decompression sickness

Notes and references

Footnotes

Citations

Sources

External links
 
 

Radiohead songs
1995 songs
1996 singles
Parlophone singles
Songs written by Thom Yorke
Songs written by Jonny Greenwood
Songs written by Ed O'Brien
Songs written by Colin Greenwood
Songs written by Philip Selway
Song recordings produced by John Leckie
Satirical songs
Songs about diseases and disorders
Songs about loneliness
Songs about friendship
British alternative rock songs
British hard rock songs
Britpop songs
Post-grunge songs